Edmonds Woodway High School is one of five high schools in the Edmonds School District in Edmonds, Washington, United States. It serves students in grades 9–12. It was ranked as the No. 318 high school in America by Newsweek Magazine in 2009.

As of 2022, the principal is Allison Larsen.

History and facilities
Edmonds-Woodway was formed when Edmonds High School and Woodway High School, both in the city of Edmonds, merged in 1990. The schools' colors (gold, purple, orange and green) were combined, although purple and green are the dominant colors used. The school used the old Woodway High School building until construction on a new facility at the old Edmonds High School site. Prior to the merger, the two schools were academic and athletic rivals, despite sharing feeder middle schools.

The new school, which opened in 1998, is located close to Highway 99 and is accessible from Interstate-5. It is designed around a central courtyard with a separate theater building and classrooms organized in small learning communities.  It received several regional and national design awards, including the 1990 Masonry Institute of Washington's Masonry Excellence Award for the use of masonry throughout the project, as well as the national annual design award of the Council of Educational Facilities Planners International, the 1999 James D. MacConnell Award for outstanding new educational facilities.  Bassetti Architects of Seattle was the architectural firm for the new building.

In June 2018, the building's clock tower was named after longtime administrator Geoff Bennett, who retired after being honored at the school's graduation ceremony.

Past principals include Dr. Terrance Mims (2015-2020), Miriam Mickelson (2012–2015), Michelle Trifunovic (2007–2012), and Alan Weiss (1995–2007). Rainer Houser was the first principal of Edmonds-Woodway, serving from 1990 to 1995.

Academics

IB Program
In 1996, Edmonds-Woodway became an International Baccalaureate (IB) World School, offering the IB Diploma Programme.

National student recognition
In 2009, Edmonds-Woodway student Sally Chu was named as the school's first US Presidential Scholar. In 2005, the school had eight National Merit Scholar finalists, the most of any high school in the state.

In 2006 the Edmonds-Woodway Deaf Academic Bowl Team competed for the first time.  It was the first team in the history of the Academic Bowl to win a Regional competition their first year.

Culture

Deaf community
Edmonds-Woodway has the largest deaf and hard-of-hearing student population in the Edmonds School District, due to programs offered for deaf and hard-of-hearing students. The school offers an American Sign Language (ASL) program.

Lifeskills program
Edmonds-Woodway has a Lifeskill Program for students with "mild to moderate developmental disabilities." Lifeskills students often take part in the annual Washington State Special Olympics. During the 2011 Winter Games in Wenatchee, Edmonds-Woodway students brought home awards.

Athletics 
The school is the location of the Edmonds School District Stadium, the home field for all high schools in the Edmonds School District. EW's traditional in-district athletics rival is Meadowdale High School. In 2008, the boys' tennis team won state in doubles tennis. The boys' wrestling program has produced multiple State and Academic State champions.

Music programs 

The Jazz Ensemble I has been accepted into the Essentially Ellington jazz festival on five occasions, in 2003, 2007, 2010, 2013, and 2017. The band regularly participates in Starbucks' Hot Java Cool Jazz performance held at the historic Paramount Theater each March. They have attended the Portland Jazz Festival (Portland, Oregon), where the two outstanding soloists of the festival (band and choir) were both EWHS students. They have also participated regularly in the University of Idaho Jazz Festival Moscow, Idaho at the Lionel Hampton Jazz Festival, where they won the Sweepstakes Award in 2018. The program has a thriving jazz combo culture and has supported winning jazz combos several times, including in 2018.

Edmonds-Woodway has three concert bands: Concert Band, Symphonic Band and Wind Symphony. Choirs include Bel-Canto, Mello-Aires and Dorian Singers. Orchestral groups include the Concert Orchestra,  Symphonic Orchestra and the auditioned Philharmonic Orchestra. For select concerts, the Full Orchestra includes advanced wind and percussion players from the Wind Symphony group. One academic music course is also offered: IB Music, which teaches music theory and music history.

In 2019 Mello-Aires were awarded best Large Vocal Jazz Ensemble by the Downbeat Magazine Student Music Awards, and are scheduled to perform at the Jazz Education Network Conference in 2020 in New Orleans.

Jazz Alley
Spring Jazz Night is a celebration of senior jazz band performers and is held at Jazz Alley in Seattle. All current jazz bands perform, as well as an alumni band with several notable professional jazz alumni.

Big Band Dance
Held every spring, the dance is set to live swing music, mostly from the 1920s to 1950s. The school's jazz bands perform, as well as the College Place Middle School jazz band and Madrona Middle School's jazz band.

Notable alumni
 Guy Anderson, abstract expressionist painter (Edmonds High School)
 Brett Davern, actor, played Jake Rosati in MTV sitcom Awkward; also in CSI: Miami, Cold Case and films
 Michael DeRosier, rock drummer, 2013 Rock and Roll Hall of Fame inductee, original drummer for rock group Heart (Woodway High School)
 Anna Faris, actress, podcaster, and writer best known for roles in The House Bunny (2008), Overboard (2018), Just Friends (2005) and Lost in Translation (2003), and star of the Scary Movie series
 Bridget Hanley, actress (Edmonds High School; performed in school plays and talent shows)
 Blaine Hardy, pitcher for the Detroit Tigers
 Jay Park, singer, songwriter, rapper, actor, CEO of AOMG and Higher Music, Also More Vision(Dance Crew Agent) based in South Korea
 Dino Rossi, politician and businessman (Woodway High School)
 James V. Scotti, an American astronomer
 Robert Shannon, 1980 and 1984 U.S. Olympic boxing team (Woodway High School)
 Rick Steves, host of his own TV show and author of several books about traveling Europe on a budget (graduated from the old Edmonds High School, before it merged with Woodway High School)

References

External links 
Edmonds-Woodway H.S.
OSPI school report card, 2010-11 school year
Official Edmonds-Woodway Music Department
 Edmonds-Woodway Parent Staff Organization

High schools in Snohomish County, Washington
International Baccalaureate schools in Washington (state)
Edmonds, Washington
Public high schools in Washington (state)
Magnet schools in Washington (state)
1990 establishments in Washington (state)